Meridian or a meridian line (from Latin meridies via Old French meridiane, meaning “midday”) may refer to

Science
 Meridian (astronomy), imaginary circle in a plane perpendicular to the planes of the celestial equator and horizon
Central meridian (planets)
 Meridian (geography), an imaginary arc on the Earth's surface from the North Pole to the South Pole
 Meridian arc, the distance between two points with the same longitude
 Prime meridian, origin of longitudes
 Principal meridian, arbitrary meridians used as references in land surveying
 Meridian line, used with a gnomon to measure solar elevation and time of year
 Autonomous sensory meridian response, a static-like or tingling sensation on the skin

Places

Cities and towns
 Meridian, California (disambiguation), U.S., multiple California towns named Meridian
 Meridian, Colorado, U.S.
 Meridian, Florida, U.S.
 Meridian, Georgia, U.S.
 Meridian, Idaho, U.S.
 Meridian, Mississippi, U.S.
 Meridian, Nebraska, U.S.
 Meridian, New York, U.S.
 Meridian, Oklahoma (disambiguation), U.S., multiple Oklahoma towns named Meridian
 Meridian, Pennsylvania, U.S.
 Meridian, Seattle, Washington, U.S.
 Meridian, Texas, U.S.

Townships
 Meridian Township, Clinton County, Illinois, U.S.
 Meridian Charter Township, Michigan, U.S.

Buildings
 Meridian (Amtrak station), or Union Station, Meridian, Mississippi, U.S.
 Meridian Mall, Meridian Township, Michigan, U.S.
 Meridian Mall, Dunedin, New Zealand
 Meridian Hall (Washington, D.C.), listed on the National Register of Historic Places in Washington, D.C., U.S.
 Meridian Manor, listed on the National Register of Historic Places in Washington, D.C., U.S.
 Meridian Mansions, listed on the National Register of Historic Places in Washington, D.C., U.S.

Other places
 Lake Meridian, Kent, Washington, U.S.
 Meridian Creek, a stream in Alaska, U.S.
 Meridian Glacier, Graham Land, Antarctica
 Meridian Peak, Eagles Nest Wilderness, near Vail, Colorado, U.S.
 Meridian Plantation, a quail-hunting plantation in Leon County, Florida, U.S., established in 1915

Arts and entertainment

Print 
 Meridian (novel), 1976 novel by Alice Walker
 Meridian (comics), 2000–2004 comic book series published by CrossGen 
 Meridian (W.I.T.C.H.), a fictional realm in the Italian comic book series W.I.T.C.H.
 Meridians: Feminism, Race, Transnationalism (est. 2000), an interdisciplinary peer-reviewed feminist journal

Film and television 
 Meridian: Kiss of the Beast, 1990 horror and romance film directed by Charles Band
 "Meridian" (Star Trek: Deep Space Nine), 1994 episode of the series
 "Meridian" (Stargate SG-1), 2002 episode of the series
 Meridian (film), 2016 film noir thriller directed by Curtis Clark
 ITV Meridian (formerly Meridian Broadcasting), ITV station for the south and south-east of England

Music
 Meridian Records, record label
 Meridian Dawn, modern death metal band
 Meridian Green, California-based folk musician
 Meridian, 1997 album by Ian Pooley
 Meridian (Miriam Yeung album), 2007 album by Miriam Young
 Meridian (album), 2012 album by Pinegrove
 "Meridian", 2017 song by Odesza from A Moment Apart

Other art
 Meridian (Hepworth), 1960 bronze sculpture by British artist Barbara Hepworth

Business
 Meridian Audio, British manufacturer of audio equipment
 Meridian Credit Union, credit union based in Ontario, Canada
 Meridian Energy, New Zealand electricity generation and electricity retailing company
 Nortel Meridian, popular PBX telephone system

Education
 Meridian High School (disambiguation)
 Meridian Technology Center, Stillwater, Oklahoma, United States

Transportation
 Meridian (train), British Rail Class 222 trains
 Meridian (commuter rail), commuter rail service in Germany operated by the Bayerische Oberlandbahn
 MS Meridian, cruise ship constructed in 1961
 Meridian (shipwreck), sunken schooner in Lake Michigan
 Piper Meridian, turboprop model of the Piper PA-46 aircraft
 Meridian LRT station, an LRT station on the Punggol LRT line East Loop in Singapore
 Meridian Airways, a defunct Ghanaian airline

Other
 Bill Meridian (fl. 1972–1983), a financial astrologer
 Meridian (Chinese medicine), traditional Chinese medical theory, often employed in acupuncture
 Meridian (horse), American Thoroughbred racehorse, winner of 1911 Kentucky Derby
 Meridian (Nosgoth), the capitol of Nosgoth in Blood Omen 2: Legacy of Kain
 Meridian (perimetry, visual field), polar coordinate system for the visual field
 Meridian (satellite), a series of Russian military communications satellites
 Meridian F.C., English non-league football club
 Meridian Hospital, a private hospital in Port Harcourt, Rivers State, Nigeria

See also
 Meridian 59, online game
 Meridian Hill Park, a park in Washington D.C., U.S.
 One Meridian Plaza, an office building that burned down in 1991 in Philadelphia, Pennsylvania, U.S.